The Taurida electoral district was a constituency created for the 1917 Russian Constituent Assembly election.

The electoral district covered the Taurida Governorate. One peasant list had been denied registration.

Taurida had a 54.74% voter turnout. The account of U.S. historian Oliver Henry Radkey, the source for the results table below, is missing the votes from Berdiansk uezd with some 3,400 electors and Vodiansk volost of Melitopol uezd. All in all there were 753 precincts in the Taurida electoral district.

Results

References

Electoral districts of the Russian Constituent Assembly election, 1917